Polymer-fullerene bulk heterojunction solar cells are a type of solar cell researched in academic laboratories. Photovoltaic cells featuring a polymeric blend of organics have shown promise in a field largely dominated by inorganic (e.g. silicon) solar cells. Specifically, fullerene derivatives act as electron acceptors for donor materials like P3HT (poly-3-hexyl thiophene-2,5-diyl), creating a polymer-fullerene based photovoltaic cell.

Some of the improvements that organic solar cells have over inorganic solar cells are that they are flexible and therefore can be applied to a larger range of surfaces. They can also be produced much more easily via inkjet printing or spray deposition, and therefore are vastly cheaper to manufacture. A downside is that, because they are not crystalline (like silicon), but instead are produced in a purposely disordered blend of electron-acceptor and -donor materials (hence the name bulk heterojunction), they have a limited efficiency of charge transport.

However, the efficiencies of these new types of photovoltaic cells have risen from 2.5% in 2001, to 5% in 2006, to greater than 10% in 2011. This is because improved methods for solution processing of acceptor and donor materials led to more efficient blending of the two materials. Further research can lead to polymer-fullerene based photovoltaic cells that approach the efficiency of current inorganic photovoltaic cells.

Structure

Materials used in polymer-based photovoltaic cells are characterized by their total electron affinities and absorption power. The electron-rich, donor materials tend to be conjugated polymers with relatively high absorption power, whereas the acceptor in this case is a highly symmetric fullerene molecule with a strong affinity for electrons, ensuring sufficient electron mobility between the two.

The arrangement of materials essentially determines the overall efficiency of the heterojunction solar cell. There are three donor-acceptor bulk morphologies: (a) the bilayer, (b) the bulk heterojunction, and (c) the “comb” structure. Typically, a polymer-fullerene bulk heterojunction solar cell has a layered structure.

Functions/Applications

The primary function of a solar cell is the conversion of light energy into electrical energy by means of the photovoltaic effect. In particular, polymer-fullerene bulk heterojunction solar cells are promising because of their potential in low processing costs and mechanical flexibility in comparison to conventional inorganic solar cells. Solution processing potentially allows reductions in manufacturing costs through screen printing, doctor blading, inkjet printing, and spray deposition at low temperatures. To overcome the narrow spectral overlap of organic polymer absorption bands, experiments have blended conjugated polymer donors with high electron affinity fullerene derivatives as acceptors to extend the spectral sensitivity. Ternary solar cells are a promising approach to increased efficiency and light harvesting properties of organic photovoltaic cells (OPV).

References

Solar cells
Fullerenes
Polymers
Energy articles needing attention
Inkjet printers
Casting (manufacturing)